Semion Andreyevich Elistratov (alternatively spelled Semen or Semyon, born 3 May 1990) is a Russian short track speed skater. He is the 2014 Olympic champion in the 5000 m relay and a double bronze medalist in the 1500 m at the 2018 and 2022 Winter Olympics.

Career

Elistratov competed at the 2010 Winter Olympics for Russia. In the 500 metres and 1000 metres, he placed third in his round one heat, failing to advance, and in the 1500 metres, he placed fourth, also failing to advance. In all three events, he ended up 24th overall.

As of 2013, Elistratov's best performance at the World Championships came in 2015, when he won a gold medal in 1500 m individual race. Elistratov won gold medals as a member of the Russian relay team at the 2013 and 2014 European Championships, and was runner-up in the overall competition at the 2014 European Championships as well.

As of 2013, Elistratov has two ISU Short Track Speed Skating World Cup victories as part of the relay team in 2012–13 at Sochi, and in the 500 metres at Changchun in 2010–11. He also has nine other podium finishes at World Cup events, three as an individual and six in relay races. His top World Cup ranking was 4th in the 1500 metres in 2012–13.

On 8 March 2016, it was known Elistratov failed a drug test for meldonium and was withdrawn from the entry list for Russia's Team to compete at the 2016 World Short Track Speed Skating Championships in Seoul, South Korea. He was temporarily suspended from the Russian team. On 13 April, the World Anti-Doping Agency gave amnesty to athletes with the presence of less than one microgram of meldonium in doping samples in tests conducted on athletes before 1 March 2016 is acceptable, WADA cites due to uncertainties and lack of studies for how long meldonium stays in the body. On 21 April 2016, the International Skating Union lifted its temporary ban on Elistratov, and he was reinstated in the team since the concentration of meldonium was below the threshold.

The International Skating Union's Official Statement was quoted: "In the case of Meldonium, the WADA recognized that there is currently a lack of clear scientific information on excretion time and considers that in certain circumstances there may be grounds for no fault or negligence on the part of the athlete.
All mentioned skaters credibly assured the ISU that they had discontinued the use of Meldonium before 1 January 2016, when the substance was included in the prohibited list. In light of the given information, the ISU has decided to lift the provisional suspension imposed on the four skaters, with immediate effect, to stay the results management process and consequently not to disqualify any results at the present stage."

World cup podiums

 14 victories – (1 × 500 m, 4 × 1000 m, 3 × 1500, 4 × 5000 m relay, 2 × 2000 m mixed relay) 
 40 podiums – (3 × 500 m, 14 × 1000 m, 11 × 1500, 10 × 5000 m relay, 2 × 2000 m mixed relay)

References

External links

1990 births
Living people
Russian male short track speed skaters
Short track speed skaters at the 2010 Winter Olympics
Short track speed skaters at the 2014 Winter Olympics
Short track speed skaters at the 2018 Winter Olympics
Short track speed skaters at the 2022 Winter Olympics
Olympic short track speed skaters of Russia
Sportspeople from Ufa
Olympic gold medalists for Russia
Olympic bronze medalists for Olympic Athletes from Russia
Olympic bronze medalists for the Russian Olympic Committee athletes
Olympic medalists in short track speed skating
Medalists at the 2014 Winter Olympics
Medalists at the 2018 Winter Olympics
Medalists at the 2022 Winter Olympics
Russian sportspeople in doping cases
Doping cases in short track speed skating
World Short Track Speed Skating Championships medalists